Estadio Mariscal Cáceres is a multi-use stadium in Tumbes, Peru. It is currently used mostly for football matches and is the home stadium of Defensor San José and Sporting Pizarro of the Copa Perú. The stadium holds 12,000 spectators

Mariscal Caceres
Buildings and structures in Tumbes Region